Otto Pöggeler (12 December 1928 in Attendorn – 10 December 2014) was a German philosopher. He specialized in phenomenology and commenting on Heidegger. In 1963 he authored the acclaimed Martin Heidegger’s Path of Thinking, one of the first rigorous attempts at tracing the development of Heidegger's thought. He also published a study of poetry of Paul Celan, and was director of the Hegel-Archiv at the Ruhr University in Bochum.

Bibliography
 Martin Heidegger's Path of Thinking (Contemporary Studies in Philosophy and the Human Science), translated by Daniel Magurshak and Sigmund Barber, 1987
 The Paths of Heidegger's Life and Thought (Contemporary Studies in Philosophy and the Human Sciences), translated by  John Bailiff, 1997
 Hegels Kritik der Romantik. 1956. 2. überarbeitete Auflage. Wilhelm Fink Verlag, München 1999, 
 Der Denkweg Martin Heideggers. Neske, Pfullingen 1963, 2. Auflage 1983. 3., erw. Auflage 1990, 4., erw. Auflage 1994.  (Übersetzungen in die meisten europäisch-amerikanischen und ostasiatischen Sprachen; u. a. Koreanisch: Seoul 1993; Chinesisch: Peking 1994)
 Philosophie und Politik bei Heidegger. Alber, Freiburg / München 1972, 2. Auflage 1974. 
 Hegels Idee einer Phänomenologie des Geistes. Alber, Freiburg / München 1973, 2. Auflage 1993. 
 Hrsg.: Hegel. Einführung in seine Philosophie. Kolleg Philosophie. Alber, Freiburg / München 1977. 
 Heidegger und die hermeneutische Philosophie. Alber, Freiburg / München 1983.  (Italienisch: Napoli 1994)
 Die Frage nach der Kunst. Von Hegel zu Heidegger. Alber, Freiburg / München 1984. 
 Hrsg.: Heidegger. Perspektiven zur Deutung seines Werks. 1984. 3., ergänzte Auflage 1994. Beltz Athenäum, Weinheim 1984. 
 Spur des Worts. Zur Lyrik Paul Celans. Alber, Freiburg / München 1986. 
 Neue Wege mit Heidegger. Alber, Freiburg / München 1992. 
 Schritte zu einer hermeneutischen Philosophie. Alber, Freiburg / München 1994. 
 Heidegger in seiner Zeit. Wilhelm Fink Verlag, München 1999. 
 Hegels Kritik der Romantik. Wilhelm Fink Verlag, München 1999. 
 Der Stein hinterm Aug. Studien zu Celans Gedichten. Wilhelm Fink Verlag, München 2000. 
 Bild und Technik . Heidegger, Klee und die moderne Kunst. Wilhelm Fink Verlag, Paderborn 2002. 
 Schicksal und Geschichte. Antigone im Spiegel der Deutungen und Gestaltungen seit Hegel und Hölderlin. Wilhelm Fink Verlag, Paderborn 2004. 
 Europa come destino e come compito. Correzioni nella filosofia ermeneutica. Guerini e Associati, Milano 2008. 
 Philosophie und hermeneutische Theologie. Heidegger, Bultmann und die Folgen. Wilhelm Fink Verlag, Paderborn 2009. 
 Wege in schwieriger Zeit. Ein Lebensbericht. Wilhelm Fink Verlag, Paderborn 2011.

References

Heidegger scholars
Phenomenologists
1928 births
Continental philosophers
Hegelian philosophers
20th-century German philosophers
21st-century German philosophers
2014 deaths